The 1960 Five Nations Championship was the thirty-first series of the rugby union Five Nations Championship. Including the previous incarnations as the Home Nations and Five Nations, this was the sixty-sixth series of the northern hemisphere rugby union championship. Ten matches were played between 9 January and 9 April. It was contested by England, France, Ireland, Scotland and Wales.

The championship was jointly won by England and France. Both teams beat Ireland, Scotland and Wales and the France-England game was drawn 3-3, giving both teams a total of 7 points in the final table. There was no tie-break in the Five Nations at the time and the championship was shared. England's three wins gave them the Triple Crown for the fourteenth time; they would not win it again until the 1980 Five Nations Championship.

Participants
The teams involved were:

Table

Results

External links

The official RBS Six Nations Site

Six Nations Championship seasons
Five Nations
Five Nations
Five Nations
Five Nations
Five Nations
Five Nations
Five Nations
Five Nations
Five Nations
Five Nations